USS Spica (AK-16) was a  commissioned by the U.S. Navy for service in World War II. She was responsible for delivering necessary goods and equipment to ships and stations in the war zone.

Construction 

SS Shannock, a cargo ship built in 1919, by American International Shipbuilding Corp. at Hog Island, Pennsylvania, was acquired by the Navy from the United States Shipping Board on 16 November 1921, and renamed Spica (AK-16). Over the following 18 years, she remained out of commission, first at New York City, then at Charleston, South Carolina, and finally at Philadelphia, Pennsylvania, from January 1927 until 1 March 1940, when Spica was commissioned at Norfolk, Virginia.

World War II activation and operations 
 
By mid-1940, Spica was assigned to the 13th Naval District; and, until late 1943, she sailed Alaskan waters carrying supplies to American outposts on the Alaskan coast and in the Aleutian Islands. During this period, she participated in the campaign to reoccupy Attu. On 24 November 1943, she headed south to San Francisco, California, whence she departed again on 5 December.

Heading via Funafuti, she reached Kwajalein Atoll in January 1944 and returned, via Pearl Harbor, to Seattle, Washington, on 22 March. For the next six months, Spica resumed her Alaska-Aleutian circuit.  On July 19 the Spica headed north with the S.S. Jonathan Harrington for Point Barrow and Cape Simpson.  Together they were delivering the Seabees of Construction Battalion Detachment 1058 and 8,200 long tons of supplies and equipment needed to explore Naval Petroleum Reserve #4.  In mid-September, she began a series of voyages from the U.S. West Coast to Hawaii which continued until mid-March 1945. In all, she made four round-trip voyages between Seattle and Oahu. She returned to Seattle on 17 March 1945 and, on 7 April, once again took up the northern Pacific supply runs, completing her last at Seattle on 14 September.

Post-war decommissioning 

In October, she was declared surplus to the needs of the Navy; and, on 18 January 1946, she decommissioned at Seattle. Her name was struck from the Navy list on 7 February 1946, and she was delivered to the Maritime Commission for lay-up pending disposal. On 13 June 1947, her hull was sold to J. T. Robinson, Ltd., a Canadian firm.

Military awards and honors 
 
Spica was awarded one battle star during World War II. Her crew members were eligible for the following medals:
 American Defense Service Medal (with Fleet clasp)
 American Campaign Medal 
 Asiatic-Pacific Campaign Medal (1)  
 World War II Victory Medal

References

External links 
 NavSource Online: Service Ship Photo Archive - AK-16 Spica

 

Design 1022 ships
1919 ships
Design 1022 ships of the United States Navy
World War II auxiliary ships of the United States
Hog Islanders
Sirius class cargo ships